Theodor Paul Albrecht (28 March 1922 – 24 July 2010) was a German entrepreneur. He established the discount supermarket chain Aldi with his brother Karl Albrecht. In 2010, Theo was ranked by Forbes as the 31st richest person in the world, with a net worth of $16.7 billion.

Business career 
Albrecht learned the grocery business from his mother, in order to escape the fate of his father in the mines. He and his brother Karl developed Albrecht Diskont, one of Europe's largest chains of supermarkets, with the motto "The best quality at the lowest price," and now known by its acronym, Aldi. Forbes has estimated Theo's fortune from the supermarket chain as approximately £11 billion. Theo and Karl Albrecht split the Aldi Company they founded in 1960 after a dispute about whether to sell cigarettes. The supermarket divided into two legally separate operating units with two distinct geographical locations. Theo's Aldi Nord set to operate in the north of Germany, while Karl's Aldi Süd set to operate in Germany's south. Theo retired from daily operations in 1993 and remained as chairman of the board.

Kidnapping 
In 1971, Albrecht was kidnapped. A ransom of seven million German marks (approximately US$2 million at the time) was paid for his release. He was held at gunpoint by Heinz-Joachim Ollenburg, a lawyer, and his accomplice Paul Kron. The ransom sum was delivered by Franz Hengsbach, then Bishop of Essen. His kidnappers were eventually caught by authorities, but only half of the money was recovered. Albrecht later unsuccessfully claimed the ransom as a tax deductible business expense in court.

Personal life 
Albrecht was raised in a Catholic household. At the age of 18, Theo was conscripted into the    Armed Forces of Nazi Germany and served in the North African campaign. Theo was captured by Americans in Tunisia. In 1946 he returned to Germany.

Albrecht's kidnapping in 1971 partially explains his and the family's hermit-like manner of existence. The kidnapping caused him to drive to work in an armored car, using a different route every day. Little is known about Theo and the Albrecht family's personal lives. The Albrecht family members are known to be very reclusive and have been described by Forbes as ‘more reclusive than the yeti’. Theo was rarely pictured by photographers, and he never made a public statement. The last published photo of Theo Albrecht dates from 1971, one day after his kidnapping. Another photo of the two Albrecht brothers together was taken in 1987 by journalist Franz Ruch.

Albrecht and his brother Karl were once said to own an island located in the North Sea, where they indulged their hobbies such as golf and pastimes, including the collecting of antique typewriters. Theo had, as do members of the Albrecht family now, a highly secure estate overlooking the Ruhr valley. Obsessed with frugality, Theo is said to have collected and used pencil stubs frequently. He was also known to wear cheap, poorly fitting suits, and preferred plain meals with many potatoes. When he was asked to approve the plans for a new store in the Netherlands, he stated that the design was good, but the paper it was drawn on was too thick: "If you use thinner paper, we will save money."

Albrecht died 24 July 2010, in his hometown of Essen.

See also
 List of kidnappings
 List of solved missing person cases

References

1922 births
1970s missing person cases
2010 deaths
20th-century German businesspeople
Aldi people
Businesspeople from Essen
German businesspeople in retailing
Formerly missing people
German billionaires
German company founders
German people taken hostage
German retail chief executives
German Roman Catholics
German Army personnel of World War II
German prisoners of war in World War II held by the United States
Kidnapped businesspeople
Kidnapped German people
Missing person cases in Germany
People from the Rhine Province
Trader Joe's